Zone A of the 1996 Davis Cup Europe/Africa Group III was one of two zones in the Europe/Africa Group III of the 1996 Davis Cup. 14 teams competed across two pools in a round robin competition, with the top team in each pool advancing to Group II in 1997. In a move to a four-tier system, the bottom three teams in each pool were reassigned to the new Group IV in 1997; all other teams remained in Group III.

Participating nations

Draw
 Venue: T.E.D. Club, Istanbul, Turkey
 Date: 20–26 May

Group A

Group B

  and  promoted to Group II in 1997.

Group A

Azerbaijan vs. Sudan

Ethiopia vs. Senegal

Iceland vs. San Marino

Azerbaijan vs. Senegal

Ethiopia vs. Sudan

Iceland vs. Lithuania

Azerbaijan vs. San Marino

Ethiopia vs. Lithuania

Iceland vs. Sudan

Ethiopia vs. Iceland

Lithuania vs. San Marino

Senegal vs. Sudan

Azerbaijan vs. Lithuania

Iceland vs. Senegal

San Marino vs. Sudan

Azerbaijan vs. Ethiopia

Lithuania vs. Sudan

San Marino vs. Senegal

Azerbaijan vs. Iceland

Ethiopia vs. San Marino

Lithuania vs. Senegal

Group B

Turkey vs. Benin

Armenia vs. Bosnia and Herzegovina

Georgia vs. Tunisia

Turkey vs. Liechtenstein

Armenia vs. Georgia

Bosnia and Herzegovina vs. Tunisia

Turkey vs. Bosnia and Herzegovina

Armenia vs. Liechtenstein

Benin vs. Georgia

Armenia vs. Tunisia

Benin vs. Liechtenstein

Bosnia and Herzegovina vs. Georgia

Turkey vs. Armenia

Benin vs. Tunisia

Bosnia and Herzegovina vs. Liechtenstein

Turkey vs. Georgia

Armenia vs. Benin

Liechtenstein vs. Tunisia

Turkey vs. Tunisia

Benin vs. Bosnia and Herzegovina

Georgia vs. Liechtenstein

References

External links
Davis Cup official website

Davis Cup Europe/Africa Zone
Europe Africa Zone Group III